LLA may stand for:

 Latitude, longitude, and altitude, in a geographic coordinate system
 Irish Land and Labour Association
 Lady Literate in Arts
Licensed Landscape Architect, a postnominal qualification for Landscape Architects in the USA
 Liga Latinoamérica, a professional esports league for the MOBA PC game League of Legends
 Link-local address, a type of computer network address
 Llanaber railway station, Gwynedd, Wales (National Rail station code)
 Löfbergs Lila Arena, former name of Löfbergs Arena
 Loma Linda Academy
 London Luton Airport
 Louisiana Library Association, a professional association for librarians in Louisiana
 Luleå Airport, IATA airport code